This article is not about Gilles II Aycelin de Montaigu (d.1378)

Gilles I Aycelin de Montaigu or Montaigut (1252 – 23 June 1318), was a French Archbishop and diplomat who became Lord Chancellor of France.

Biography
Gilles I Aycelin de Montaigu was Archbishop of Narbonne (1287–1311) and Archbishop of Rouen (1311–1318). He was one of the most influential counselors of King Philip IV of France. He negotiated the Treaty of Tournai (1298) and Treaty of Montreuil (1299) with the English, and created the Collège de Montaigu in 1314.

Sources

Chancellors of France
Archbishops of Narbonne
Archbishops of Rouen
13th-century Roman Catholic archbishops in France
14th-century Roman Catholic archbishops in France
1252 births
1318 deaths
Year of birth uncertain